Duren Sawit is a district (kecamatan) of East Jakarta, Indonesia. The rough boundaries of Duren Sawit are I. Gusti Ngurah Rai road to the north, Kali Sunter to the west, and Kali Malang to the south. The district borders the districts of Jatinegara to the west, Cakung and Pulo Gadung to the north, and Makasar to the south, and Bekasi to the east.

Duren Sawit was part of Jatinegara district until 1990. The district of Duren Sawit was established with the issuance of Presidential Decree No. 60 year 1990.

Duren Sawit (district) is divided into seven Kelurahan or urban villages:
Pondok Bambu - area code - 13430
Duren Sawit - area code - 13440
Pondok Kelapa - area code - 13450
Pondok Kopi - area code - 13460
Malaka Jaya - area code - 13460
Malaka Sari - area code - 13460
Klender - area code - 13470

References

Districts of Jakarta
East Jakarta